Karel Kovář is a former Czechoslovak figure skater of Slovak origin, now a figure skating coach in the United States.

Career
After having a short solo career, he joined his sister Dagmar Kovářová in pairs. He relocated to Bratislava to train with coach Agnesa Búřilová. Kovář and Kovářová participated in the European Championships in Prague in 1988, where they finished in the last, 11th place. In 1986–87 and 1987–88 seasons, they finished second in the Czechoslovak figure skating championships behind René Novotný and Lenka Knapová. Two years later he participated in the 1990 European Championships joining Soviet Union's Svetlana Dragaeva in a mixed-nation couple (some sources identify them as competing under the flag of ISU), finishing 13th. They were training in Leningrad, under Ludmila Velikova. He was then studying at the Lesgaft State Institute of Physical Education, Sport and Health.

After retiring from his competitive career, he performed in Disney on Ice, where he met his future wife Amanda Baer Kovar. They together participated in the opening and closing ceremonies of the 2002 Winter Olympics in Salt Lake City.

He settled in the United States, in Ogden where he works as a figure skating coach with his wife, occasionally cooperating with Jozef Sabovčík. Their children, Kai Kovar and Milada Kovar are both figure skaters. Karel Kovář works as the skating director for Weber County.

Karel Kovář and his wife were the first coaches of the future Olympic champion Nathan Chen, teaching him until he was 9.

Results

With Dragaeva

With Kovářová

References

Czechoslovak figure skaters